Suzanne Helen Paine (10 March 1946 – 10 November 1985) was a British economist. She was lecturer at the University of Cambridge, UK and a Fellow of Clare and Girton colleges.

Her subject area was development economics, particularly in the countries of Turkey, Japan, India, and China. She supported economics to have a social purpose, along with rigorous analysis. She was a founder member of the editorial board of Cambridge Journal of Economics. Among her doctoral students was Abhijit Sen. Her work continued to be cited into the twenty-first century.

The Suzy Paine Fund was established in her memory to fund travel to Asia relevant to their studies for students in the subject area of political economy.

Publications
She was the author or co-author of several books and articles, including:
 Adam Fforde and Suzanne H. Paine (1987) The Limits of National Liberation: Problems of Economic Management in the Democratic Republic of Vietnam, with a Statistical Appendix Routledge, London pp 268 
 Suzanne Paine (1981) Spatial aspects of Chinese development: Issues, outcomes and policies 1949–79. The Journal of Development Studies volume 17 issue 2  pp. 133-195
 Suzanne Paine (1976) Balanced development: Maoist conception and Chinese practice. World Development volume 4 issue 4 pp. 277-304
 Suzanne H. Paine (1971) Wage Differentials in the Japanese Manufacturing Sector. Oxford Economic Papers New Series, volume 23, issue 2  pp. 212-238

References

External links
 Suzanne Paine papers - Clare College - Personal Papers - Archives Hub
 Centre of South Asian Studies - Paine Papers

1946 births
1985 deaths
British women economists
British development economists
20th-century British women writers
Fellows of Girton College, Cambridge
Fellows of Clare College, Cambridge